Kyaiklat Township is a township of Pyapon District in the Ayeyarwady Division of Myanmar.

Townships of Ayeyarwady Region